P.M.L. Kalyanasundaram is an Indian politician. He was elected to the Puducherry Legislative Assembly from Kalapet as a member of the Bharatiya Janata Party.

References 

Bharatiya Janata Party politicians from Puducherry
Puducherry MLAs 2021–2026
Puducherry politicians
Puducherry MLAs 2011–2016
Living people
Year of birth missing (living people)
All India NR Congress politicians